Aaron Krickstein was the defending champion but lost in the second round this year.

Tomáš Šmíd won the title, defeating Mats Wilander 6–4, 6–4 in the final.

Seeds

  Mats Wilander (final)
  Joakim Nyström (second round, withdrew)
  Tomáš Šmíd (champion)
  Martín Jaite (first round)
  Aaron Krickstein (second round)
  Henri Leconte (semifinals)
  Heinz Günthardt (second round)
  Jakob Hlasek (quarterfinals)

Draw

Finals

Top half

Bottom half

External links
 ATP main draw

1985 in Swiss sport
1985 Grand Prix (tennis)
1985 Geneva Open